Ben Street is an American jazz double bassist. Street has performed and recorded with many renowned artists, including John Scofield, Kurt Rosenwinkel, Mark Turner, Ben Monder, Michael Eckroth, Sam Rivers, Billy Hart, Danilo Perez, Aaron Parks, and Adam Cruz, among others.

He studied the acoustic bass with former Weather Report bassist Miroslav Vitous.

He is the son of saxophonist and saxophone mouthpiece maker Bill Street and is a native of Maine.

Discography
With Anthony Coleman
 Morenica (Tzadik, 1998)
 Our Beautiful Garden is Open (Tzadik, 2002)

With Kurt Rosenwinkel
 The Enemies of Energy (Verve, 2000)
 The Next Step (Verve, 2001)
 Heartcore (Verve, 2003)

With Jakob Bro
 The Stars Are All New Songs (Loveland, 2008)
 Balladeering (Loveland, 2009)

With Andrew Cyrille
 The Declaration of Musical Independence (ECM, 2016)
 The News (ECM, 2021)

With Andrew Cyrille, Søren Kjœrgaard
 Optics (Ilk, 2008)
 Open Opus (Ilk, 2010)
 Femklang (Ilk, 2012)
With Tom Harrell
 Infinity (HighNote, 2019)
With Billy Hart
 Billy Hart Quartet (HighNote, 2006)
 All Our Reasons (ECM, 2012)
 One Is the Other (ECM, 2014)

With Albert Heath, Ethan Iverson
 Live at Smalls (SmallsLive, 2010)
 Tootie's Tempo (Sunnyside, 2013)
 Philadelphia Beat (Sunnyside, 2015)
With Ben Monder
Dust (Arabesque, 1997)
With Orange Then Blue
 1999 Hold the Elevator: Live in Europe & Other Haunts

With Danilo Pérez
 2003 ...Till Then
 2005 Live at the Jazz Showcase
 2010 Providencia

With Sam Rivers
 2005 Purple Violets
 2005 Violet Violets

With Chiara Civello 
 2005 Last Quarter Moon
 2007 The Space Between

With Lage Lund
 2010 Unlikely Stories
 2012 Live at Smalls
 2013 Foolhardy
 2015 Idlewild

With David Sanchez
 2004 Coral
 2008 Cultural Survival

With Others
 1997 Dust, Ben Monder
 1998 La Bikina, Edward Simon
 2000 Love Decides, Jane Olivor
 2002 Rainy Day Assembly, Tess Wiley
 2003 Friendship, Perico Sambeat
 2005 A Moment's Glance, Julie Hardy
 2005 Journey to Donnafugata, Salvatore Bonafede
 2005 Place and Time, Anat Cohen
 2006 Melancolia, Manuel Valera
 2006 When You're There, Frank LoCrasto
 2007 Keep Your Sunny Side Up, Bill Carrothers
 2007 The Timeless Now, Dayna Stephens
 2007 Unspoken Dialogue, Bobby Selvaggio
 2009 Angelica, Francesco Cafiso
 2009 Open Season, Ralph Alessi
 2010 All My Friends Are Here, Arif Mardin
 2012 Three Things of Beauty, Bruce Barth
 2012 Continuum, David Virelles (Pi)
 2015 Kikuchi/Street/Morgan/Osgood, Masabumi Kikuchi, Thomas Morgan, Kresten Osgood (Ilk)
 2015 Space Squid, Bill Stewart
 2016 Leaving Everything Behind, Yelena Eckemoff (L&H)
 2017 Find the Way, with Aaron Parks and Billy Hart (ECM)
 2019 Common Practice, Ethan Iverson (ECM)

References 

Year of birth missing (living people)
Living people
American jazz double-bassists
Male double-bassists
21st-century double-bassists
21st-century American male musicians
American male jazz musicians
Immigrant Union members